Pamela K. Brown (September 12, 1952 – June 10, 2011) was a Nebraskan businesswoman and legislator. She served as state senator from Omaha.

Personal life
Born in San Antonio, Texas, she graduated from Broken Bow High School and University of Nebraska-Lincoln. She was married and had one child.

She was a member of the National Conference of State Legislatures Task Force on Genetic Technologies and was a board director for the United Way of the Midlands, the Safety and Health Council of Greater Omaha, and the Westside Schools Foundation.

State legislature
Brown was elected in 1994 to represent the 6th Nebraska legislative district and reelected in 1998 and 2002. She sat on the Government, Military, and Veterans Affairs; Transportation and Telecommunications; and Intergovernmental Cooperation committees.

Death
Brown died from ovarian cancer, aged 58, on June 10, 2011.

References

1952 births
2011 deaths
Deaths from cancer in Nebraska
Deaths from ovarian cancer
Place of death missing
University of Nebraska–Lincoln alumni
Democratic Party Nebraska state senators
People from Broken Bow, Nebraska
Politicians from Omaha, Nebraska
Politicians from San Antonio
Women state legislators in Nebraska
Businesspeople from Omaha, Nebraska
20th-century American businesspeople
20th-century American women
21st-century American women